Phrao is a district (amphoe) in the north-eastern part of Chiang Mai province in northern Thailand. Its major town, Phrao, lies 107 km north-northeast of Chiang Mai. The meaning of Phrao in English is 'coconut'.

History
The name Phrao was given to this city around 1281 by King Mangrai of Lan Na who had been on his way to invade Hariphunchai Kingdom. After this, Mangrai sent his third son, Khrua to rule Phrao. Hereafter, Phrao became one of the important cities of the Lan Na Kingdom.

King Tilokarat, who is considered a god-king of Lan Na, once ruled this city before becoming a king.

Geography

Neighboring districts are (from the south clockwise) Doi Saket, Mae Taeng, Chiang Dao, Chai Prakan of Chiang Mai Province, Mae Suai, and Wiang Pa Pao of Chiang Rai province.

The Khun Tan Range stretches from north to south along the eastern side of the district.

Administration
The district is divided into 11 sub-districts (tambon), which are further subdivided into 108 villages (muban). Wiang Phrao is a township (thesaban tambon), which covers parts of tambon Wiang and the whole of Thung Luang. There are a further nine tambon administrative organizations (TAO).

See also
 Wat Doi Mae Pang

References

Bibliography
 The Chiang Mai Chronicle 2nd ed, tr. David K. Wyatt and Aroonrut Wichienkeeo, Chiang Mai: Silkworm Books, 1998, 
 Forbes, Andrew, and Henley, David, "The Vale of Phrao" in: Ancient Chiang Mai Volume 3. Chiang Mai: Cognoscenti Books, 2012. ASIN: B006IN1RNW
 Ongsakul, Sarassawadee, History of Lan Na, trans. Chitraporn Tanratanakul, Chian Mai: Silkworm Books, Thai text 2001, English text 2005,

External links

amphoe.com

Phrao
Populated places in Chiang Mai province
Cities and towns in Thailand
Cities and towns in Chiang Mai province